Crazy Town is an American rap rock band.

Crazy Town or Crazytown may refer to:

 "Crazy Town", a song by Velocity Girl from their album Copacetic 
 "Crazy Town" (song), a 2010 song by Jason Aldean
 Crazy Town (film), a 1932 short animated film
 Crazy Town: The Rob Ford Story, a 2014 book by Robyn Doolittle
 Crazytown, a 1953 Harvey Films cartoon
 "Crazytown" (Diesel song), 2006